"Harmony" is Beni Arashiro's debut single, which served as the theme for TV ASAHI Friday Night's Drama "Rei-kan Bus Guide Jikenbo".

Track listing 

 Harmony
 Silhouette
 Emotions
 Harmony (Instrumental)
 Silhouette (Instrumental)

Charts
Oricon Sales Chart (Japan)

References

Beni (singer) songs
2004 debut singles
Japanese television drama theme songs
2004 songs
Avex Trax singles